Allen Stone (born March 13, 1987) is an American soul and R&B singer and musician.

Early life 
Stone was born on March 13, 1987, in Chewelah, Washington, near Spokane. He began his career singing at his father's church. His father was a preacher and his mother was an OB/GYN nurse. He began singing in church at the age of 3. By 14, Stone was leading worship at his church and playing the guitar. The draw of music for Allen was mainly being able to express himself to a crowd of people.

Allen did not discover soul music until he was a teenager, and started collecting classic albums from the 1960s and 1970s. He was 15 when he heard Stevie Wonder's 1973 album Innervisions.

When Stacie Orrico, a close friend of Allen's as a teen, became successful in music, Stone decided to become serious about his musical career. Orrico released a record and had become successful. "She was traveling, singing everywhere, and recording," Stone related. "She was just a year older than me and I was like, 'Man that would be so much fun to do, sing and actually have people listen.'"

When Stone was 18, he moved to Spokane, where he attended community college for a semester followed by a year at Moody Bible Institute in Spokane. After that year, Stone had an epiphany. He stated in an interview with SF Gate, "I learned the history of the church and the conception of the Bible and learned about the religion and really just, like, didn't believe it... I got to the point where it was like, 'I don't believe this is the truth.'" Not long after, he moved to Seattle to pursue his musical career.

Influences 
Stone has been influenced by Stevie Wonder, Marvin Gaye, The Meters, Aretha Franklin, Gladys Knight, Jamie Lidell and James Morrison. The New York Times compared his socially conscious music to the likes of Donny Hathaway, Bill Withers and two of his musical influences Stevie Wonder and Marvin Gaye.

Career 
He has released five albums, Last to Speak (2010, self-released), the self-titled Allen Stone (2011, ATO Records), Radius (2015, Capitol Records), Building Balance (2019, ATO Records) and APART (2021, ATO Records). Radius was also re-released by ATO Records in 2016 as a deluxe edition with seven additional tracks.

Stone had been touring cross-country for a few years and sold a self-released album on the Internet. However, it was not until October 2011, when his second album was released, that his career began to truly kick off. On this album, he was backed by Raphael Saadiq's rhythm section and Miles Davis' keyboardist Deron Johnson. A few songs on Allen Stone were co-written with Andy Grammer. Allen Stone peaked at the number 2 spot on the R&B/Soul charts on iTunes and hit number 9 and number 35 on the Billboard Heatseekers and R&B/Hip Hop Album charts, respectively.  USA Today called Allen Stone a "pitch-perfect powerhouse".

On October 26, 2011, he performed his song "Unaware" on Conan.

In 2012, he was featured on the song "Neon Cathedral" by Macklemore and Ryan Lewis off their album The Heist.

Stone was voted one of mtvU's Freshman 5 in late 2012 and tapped as VH1's first "You Oughta Know" artist of 2013.

Then on January 3, 2013, he appeared on The Ellen DeGeneres Show and sang "Sleep".

He appeared on Conan again on June 17, 2015.

Radius, his first album for Capitol Records, was released on May 26, 2015. It was recorded in collaboration with Magnus Tingsek, and features production from Malay and Benny Cassette. Allen Stone said of the album title, "The radius is that line extending from the center of the circle to its exterior, and in a lot of ways this album is about getting out things deep inside—whether it's love or insecurity or joy or frustration about things going on today." On March 25, 2016, Radius was re-released as a deluxe edition by ATO Records with seven additional tracks.

On April 13, 2017, Stone's song "Perfect World" was featured on the trailer for the upcoming Netflix series Dear White People.

In 2018, Allen released the single "Brown Eyed Lover"  and appeared on American Idol in 2018, to sing duets with multiple contestants. His fourth full-length album, 2019's Building Balance, was co-produced with Jamie Lidell.

In 2022, Allen competed in the American Song Contest, representing his home state of Washington. He placed first out of eleven in the jury vote for his semi-final, and advanced to the competition final and finished in fifth place despite not performing live due to personal reasons.

October 4, 2022, Allen released his new single "5 Minutes" and will be going on tour in Australia on November 11, 2022.

Social commentary in music
On Allen Stone's self-titled album, a few songs discuss social and political issues, such as "Unaware", "Contact High", and "What I've Seen".

A live music video of "Unaware – Allen Stone – Live From His Mother's Living Room" on Stone's YouTube account has been viewed over 13,000,000 times. Stone wanted to have a different and weird setting for this video, so they recorded it on a set that looked like a living room.

Discography

Albums
Last to Speak (2010, self-released)
Allen Stone (2011, self-released – Released in 2012 by ATO Records)
Radius (May 26, 2015, Capitol; deluxe edition: March 25, 2016, ATO Records)
Building Balance (November 8, 2019)
APART (November 12, 2021)

As featured artist 
 Run Deep (March 23, 2018, "Turnt Up" by Deva Mahal, Motema Records)

References

External links

American rhythm and blues singer-songwriters
American soul musicians
American soul singers
American male singer-songwriters
Singer-songwriters from Washington (state)
1987 births
Living people
21st-century American singers
21st-century American male singers
ATO Records artists
MapleMusic Recordings artists
Capitol Records artists
American Song Contest contestants